The 2014–15 Abilene Christian Wildcats men's basketball team represented Abilene Christian University during the 2014–15 NCAA Division I men's basketball season. The Wildcats were led by fourth year head coach Joe Golding and played their home games at the Moody Coliseum. They are members of the Southland Conference. Abilene Christian, in their second year of DII to DI transition, was not eligible for the Southland Tournament, but was a counter for scheduling purposes and was also considered as a DI RPI member.

The Wildcats were picked to finish eleventh (11th) in the Southland Conference Coaches' Poll and tied for twelfth (12th) in the conference Sports Information Director's Poll.  The Wildcats finished the season with a 10–21 overall record and finished in twelfth place in conference play with a 4–14 record.

Roster

Schedule and results
Source

|-
!colspan=9 style="" | Out of Conference

|-
!colspan=9 style="" | Conference Games

See also
2014–15 Abilene Christian Wildcats women's basketball team

References

Abilene Christian Wildcats men's basketball seasons
Abilene Christian
Abilene Christian Wildcats basketball
Abilene Christian Wildcats basketball